Henry Brooke, who was born at Dublin in 1738, painted historical subjects in London from 1761 till 1767, when he returned to Dublin where he died in 1806. He was the father of painter William Henry Brooke.

References
 

1738 births
1806 deaths
Painters from Dublin (city)
18th-century Irish painters
19th-century Irish painters
Irish male painters
19th-century Irish male artists